Mike Cherry may refer to:
 Mike Cherry (baseball), American baseball player
 Mike Cherry (American football) (born 1973), American football quarterback
 Mike Cherry (politician), American politician

See also
Michael Cherry (disambiguation)